Vareilles is the name or part of the name of several communes in France:
 Vareilles, Creuse
 Vareilles, Saône-et-Loire
 Vareilles, Yonne

Vareille and Vareilles are surnames of French origin. People with those names include;
 Jérôme Vareille (born 1974), French footballer
 Patrice Vareilles (born 1978), French footballer

See also 
 Varilhes, a commune in the Ariège department in southwestern France
 

Surnames of French origin